Peter De Roover (born 1962) is a Belgian politician and a member of the Flemish nationalist New Flemish Alliance party. He was elected as a member of the  Belgian Chamber of Representatives in 2014.

Biography
De Roover was born in Turnhout. From 1980 to 1984, he studied economics at the Saint Ignatius University Centre, Antwerp where he was active in the Flemish nationalist Nationalistische Studentenvereniging group and helped to edit their magazine. In 2014, he ran for the Belgian Federal Parliament for the N-VA party and was elected to the Chamber of Representatives for the Antwerp constituency. In 2015, he was appointed treasurer of the party and in 2016 became the N-VA's group leader and spokesman in the Chamber.

References 

Living people
1962 births
21st-century Belgian politicians
People from Turnhout
New Flemish Alliance politicians
Members of the Chamber of Representatives (Belgium)